Mushroom poisoning is poisoning resulting from the ingestion of mushrooms that contain toxic substances. Its symptoms can vary from slight gastrointestinal discomfort to death in about 10 days. Mushroom toxins are secondary metabolites produced by the fungus.

Mushroom poisoning is usually the result of ingestion of wild mushrooms after misidentification of a toxic mushroom as an edible species. The most common reason for this misidentification is a close resemblance in terms of color and general morphology of the toxic mushrooms species with edible species. To prevent mushroom poisoning, mushroom gatherers familiarize themselves with the mushrooms they intend to collect, as well as with any similar-looking toxic species. The safety of eating wild mushrooms may depend on methods of preparation for cooking.

Signs and symptoms

Poisonous mushrooms contain a variety of different toxins that can differ markedly in toxicity. Symptoms of mushroom poisoning may vary from gastric upset to organ failure resulting in death. Serious symptoms do not always occur immediately after eating, often not until the toxin attacks the kidney or liver, sometimes days or weeks later.

The most common consequence of mushroom poisoning is simply gastrointestinal upset. Most "poisonous" mushrooms contain gastrointestinal irritants that cause vomiting and diarrhea (sometimes requiring hospitalization), but usually no long-term damage. However, there are a number of recognized mushroom toxins with specific, and sometimes deadly, effects:

The period between ingestion and the onset of symptoms varies dramatically between toxins, some taking days to show symptoms identifiable as mushroom poisoning.
 Alpha-Amanitin: For 6–12 hours, there are no symptoms. This is followed by a period of gastrointestinal upset (vomiting and profuse, watery diarrhea). This stage is caused primarily by the phallotoxins and typically lasts 24 hours. At the end of this second stage is when severe liver damage begins. The damage may continue for another 2–3 days. Kidney damage can also occur. Some patients will require a liver transplant. Amatoxins are found in some mushrooms in the genus Amanita, but are also found in some species of Galerina and Lepiota. Overall, mortality is between 10 and 15 percent. Recently, Silybum marianum or blessed milk thistle has been shown to protect the liver from amanita toxins and promote regrowth of damaged cells.
 Orellanine: This toxin generally causes no symptoms for 3–20 days after ingestion. Typically around day 11, the process of kidney failure begins, and is usually symptomatic by day 20. These symptoms can include pain in the area of the kidneys, thirst, vomiting, headache, and fatigue. A few species in the very large genus Cortinarius contain this toxin. People having eaten mushrooms containing orellanine may experience early symptoms as well, because the mushrooms often contain other toxins in addition to orellanine. A related toxin that causes similar symptoms but within 3–6 days has been isolated from Amanita smithiana and some other related toxic Amanitas.
 Muscarine: Muscarine stimulates the muscarinic receptors of the nerves and muscles. Symptoms include sweating, salivation, tears, blurred vision, palpitations, and, in high doses, respiratory failure. Muscarine is found in mushrooms of the genus Omphalotus, notably the jack o' Lantern mushrooms. It is also found in A. muscaria, although it is now known that the main effect of this mushroom is caused by ibotenic acid. Muscarine can also be found in some Inocybe species and Clitocybe species, in particular Clitocybe dealbata, and some red-pored Boletes.
 Gyromitrin: Stomach acids convert gyromitrin to monomethylhydrazine (MMH), a compound employed in rocket fuel. It affects multiple body systems. It blocks the important neurotransmitter GABA, leading to stupor, delirium, muscle cramps, loss of coordination, tremors, and/or seizures. It causes severe gastrointestinal irritation, leading to vomiting and diarrhea. In some cases, liver failure has been reported. It can also cause red blood cells to break down, leading to jaundice, kidney failure, and signs of anemia. It is found in mushrooms of the genus Gyromitra. A gyromitrin-like compound has also been identified in mushrooms of the genus Verpa.
 Coprine: Coprine is metabolized to a chemical that resembles disulfiram. It inhibits aldehyde dehydrogenase (ALDH), which, in general, causes no harm, unless the person has alcohol in their bloodstream while ALDH is inhibited. This can happen if alcohol is ingested shortly before or up to a few days after eating the mushrooms. In that case, the alcohol cannot be completely metabolized, and the person will experience flushed skin, vomiting, headache, dizziness, weakness, apprehension, confusion, palpitations, and sometimes trouble to breathe. Coprine is found mainly in mushrooms of the genus Coprinus, although similar effects have been noted after ingestion of Clitocybe clavipes.
 Ibotenic acid: Decarboxylates into muscimol upon ingestion. The effects of muscimol vary, but nausea and vomiting are common. Confusion, euphoria, or sleepiness are possible. Loss of muscular coordination, sweating, and chills are likely. Some people experience visual distortions, a feeling of strength, or delusions. Symptoms normally appear after 30 minutes to 2 hours and last for several hours. A. muscaria, the "Alice in Wonderland" mushroom, is known for the hallucinatory experiences caused by muscimol, but A. pantherina and A. gemmata also contain the same compound. While normally self-limiting, fatalities have been associated with A. pantherina, and consumption of a large number of any of these mushrooms is likely to be dangerous.
 Arabitol: A sugar alcohol, similar to mannitol, which causes no harm in most people but causes gastrointestinal irritation in some. It is found in small amounts in oyster mushrooms, and considerable amounts in Suillus species and Hygrophoropsis aurantiaca (the "false chanterelle").

Causes
New species of fungi are continuing to be discovered, with an estimated number of 800 new species registered annually. This, added to the fact that many investigations have recently reclassified some species of mushrooms from edible to poisonous has made older classifications insufficient at describing what now is known about the different species of fungi that are harmful to humans.  Thus, contrary to what older registers state, it is now thought that of the approximately 100,000 known fungi species found worldwide, about 100 of them are poisonous to humans. However, by far the majority of mushroom poisonings are not fatal, and the majority of fatal poisonings are attributable to the Amanita phalloides mushroom.

 
A majority of these cases are due to mistaken identity. This is a common occurrence with A. phalloides in particular, due to its resemblance to the Asian paddy-straw mushroom, Volvariella volvacea. Both are light-colored and covered with a universal veil when young.

Amanitas can be mistaken for other species, as well, in particular when immature. On at least one occasion they have been mistaken for Coprinus comatus. In this case, the victim had some limited experience in identifying mushrooms, but did not take the time to correctly identify these particular mushrooms until after he began to experience symptoms of mushroom poisoning.

 
The author of Mushrooms Demystified, David Arora cautions puffball-hunters to beware of Amanita "eggs", which are Amanitas still entirely encased in their universal veil. Amanitas at this stage are difficult to distinguish from puffballs. Foragers are encouraged to always cut the fruiting bodies of suspected puffballs in half, as this will reveal the outline of a developing Amanita should it be present within the structure.

A majority of mushroom poisonings, in general, are the result of small children, especially toddlers in the "grazing" stage, ingesting mushrooms found on the lawn. While this can happen with any mushroom, Chlorophyllum molybdites is often implicated due to its preference for growing in lawns. C. molybdites causes severe gastrointestinal upset but is not considered deadly poisonous.

A few poisonings are the result of misidentification while attempting to collect hallucinogenic mushrooms for recreational use. In 1981, one fatality and two hospitalizations occurred following consumption of Galerina marginata, mistaken for a Psilocybe species. Galerina and Psilocybe species are both small, brown, and sticky, and can be found growing together. However, Galerina contains amatoxins, the same poison found in the deadly Amanita species. Another case reports kidney failure following ingestion of Cortinarius orellanus, a mushroom containing orellanine.

It is natural that accidental ingestion of hallucinogenic species also occurs, but is rarely harmful when ingested in small quantities. Cases of serious toxicity have been reported in small children. Amanita pantherina, while containing the same hallucinogens as Amanita muscaria (e.g., ibotenic acid and muscimol), has been more commonly associated with severe gastrointestinal upset than its better-known counterpart.

 
Although usually not fatal, Omphalotus spp., "Jack-o-lantern mushrooms", are another cause of sometimes significant toxicity. They are sometimes mistaken for chanterelles. Both are bright-orange and fruit at the same time of year, although Omphalotus grows on wood and has true gills rather than the veins of a Cantharellus. They contain toxins known as illudins, which causes gastrointestinal symptoms.

Bioluminescent species are generally inedible and often mildly toxic.

Clitocybe dealbata, which is occasionally mistaken for an oyster mushroom or other edible species contains muscarine.

Toxicities can also occur with collection of morels. Even true morels, if eaten raw, will cause gastrointestinal upset. Typically, morels are thoroughly cooked before eating. Verpa bohemica, although referred to as "thimble morels" or "early morels" by some, have caused toxic effects in some individuals. Gyromitra spp., "false morels", are deadly poisonous if eaten raw. They contain a toxin called gyromitrin, which can cause neurotoxicity, gastrointestinal toxicity, and destruction of the blood cells. The Finns consume Gyromitra esculenta after parboiling, but this may not render the mushroom entirely safe, resulting in its being called the "fugu of the Finnish cuisine".

A more unusual toxin is coprine, a disulfiram-like compound that is harmless unless ingested within a few days of ingesting alcohol. It inhibits aldehyde dehydrogenase, an enzyme required for breaking down alcohol. Thus, the symptoms of toxicity are similar to being hung over—flushing, headache, nausea, palpitations, and, in severe cases, trouble breathing. Coprinus species, including Coprinopsis atramentaria, contain coprine. Coprinus comatus does not, but it is best to avoid mixing alcohol with other members of this genus.

Recently, poisonings have also been associated with Amanita smithiana. These poisonings may be due to orellanine, but the onset of symptoms occurs in 4 to 11 hours, which is much quicker than the 3 to 20 days normally associated with orellanine.

Paxillus involutus is also inedible when raw, but is eaten in Europe after pickling or parboiling. However, after the death of the German mycologist Dr. Julius Schäffer, it was discovered that the mushroom contains a toxin that can stimulate the immune system to attack its red blood cells. This reaction is rare but can occur even after safely eating the mushroom for many years. Similarly, Tricholoma equestre was widely considered edible and good, until it was connected with rare cases of rhabdomyolysis.

In the fall of 2004, thirteen deaths were associated with consumption of Pleurocybella porrigens or "angel's wings". In general, these mushrooms are considered edible. All the victims died of an acute brain disorder, and all had pre-existing kidney disease. The exact cause of the toxicity was not known at this time and the deaths cannot be definitively attributed to mushroom consumption.

However, mushroom poisoning is not always due to mistaken identity. For example, the highly toxic ergot Claviceps purpurea, which grows on rye, is sometimes ground up with rye, unnoticed, and later consumed. This can cause devastating, even fatal effects, which is called ergotism.

Cases of idiosyncratic or unusual reactions to fungi can also occur. Some are probably due to allergy, others to some other kind of sensitivity. It is not uncommon for a person to experience gastrointestinal upset associated with one particular mushroom species or genus.

Some mushrooms might concentrate toxins from their growth substrate, such as Chicken of the Woods growing on yew trees.

Poisonous mushrooms

Of the most lethal mushrooms, five—the death cap (A. phalloides), the three destroying angels (A. virosa, A. bisporigera, and A. ocreata), and the fool's mushroom (A. verna)—belong to the genus Amanita, and two more—the deadly webcap (C. rubellus), and the fool's webcap (C. orellanus)—are from the genus Cortinarius. Several species of Galerina, Lepiota, and Conocybe also contain lethal amounts of amatoxins. Deadly species are listed in the List of deadly fungi.

The following species may cause great discomfort, sometimes requiring hospitalization, but are not considered deadly.
 Amanita muscaria (fly agaric) – Contains the psychoactive muscimol and the neurotoxin ibotenic acid. Ibotenic acid decarboxylates into muscimol upon curing of the mushroom, rendering it relatively non-toxic, though death via respiratory depression is possible. Muscimol intoxication is often considered unpleasant and undesirable, however, and as such has seen little recreational use compared to the unrelated psilocybin mushroom, though it has been used as an entheogen by the native people of Siberia.
 Amanita pantherina (panther mushroom) – contains similar toxins as A. muscaria, but is associated with more fatalities than A. muscaria.
 Chlorophyllum molybdites (greengills) – causes intense gastrointestinal upset.
 Entoloma (pinkgills) – some species are highly poisonous, such as livid entoloma (Entoloma sinuatum), Entoloma rhodopolium, and Entoloma nidorosum. Symptoms of intense gastrointestinal upset appear after 20 minutes to 4 hours, caused by an unidentified gastrointestinal irritant.
 Many Inocybe species such as Inocybe fastigiata and Inocybe geophylla contain muscarine
 Inosperma erubescens has caused death.
 Some white Clitocybe species, including C. rivulosa and C. dealbata – contain muscarine.
 Tricholoma pardinum, Tricholoma tigrinum (tiger tricholoma) – gastrointestinal upset due to an unidentified toxin, begins in 15 minutes to 2 hours and lasts 4 to 6 days.
 Tricholoma equestre (man-on-horseback) – until recently thought edible and good, can lead to rhabdomyolysis after repeated consumption.
 Hypholoma fasciculare/Naematoloma fasciculare (sulfur tuft) – usually causes gastrointestinal upset, but the toxins fasciculol E and F could lead to paralysis and death.
 Paxillus involutus (brown roll-rim) – once thought edible, but now found to destroy red blood cells with regular or long-term consumption.
 Rubroboletus satanas (Devil's bolete), Suillellus luridus, Rubroboletus legaliae, Chalciporus piperatus, Neoboletus luridiformis, Rubroboletus pulcherrimus – gastrointestinal irritation. Of these, only R. pulcherrimus has been implicated in a death. Many books list N. luridiformis as edible, but Arora lists it as "to be avoided".
 Hebeloma crustuliniforme (known as poison pie or fairy cakes) – causes gastrointestinal symptoms such as nausea and vomiting.
 Russula emetica (the sickener) – as its name implies, causes rapid vomiting. Other Russulas with a peppery taste (Russula silvicola, Russula mairei) will likely do the same.
 Agaricus hondensis, Agaricus californicus, Agaricus praeclaresquamosus, Agaricus xanthodermus – cause vomiting and diarrhea in most people, although some people seem to be immune.
 Lactifluus piperatus, Lactarius torminosus, Lactarius rufus – these and other peppery-tasting milk-caps are pickled and eaten in Scandinavia, but are indigestible or poisonous unless correctly prepared.
 Lactarius vinaceorufescens, Lactarius uvidus – reported to be poisonous. Arora reports that all yellow- or purple-staining Lactarius are "best avoided".
 Ramaria gelatinosa – causes indigestion in many people, although some seem immune.
 Gomphus floccosus (the scaly chanterelle) – causes gastric upset in many people, although some eat it without problems. G. floccosus is sometimes confused with the chanterelle.

Prognosis and treatment 
Some mushrooms contain less toxic compounds and, therefore, are not severely poisonous. Poisonings by these mushrooms may respond well to treatment. However, certain types of mushrooms contain very potent toxins and are very poisonous; so even if symptoms are treated promptly, mortality is high. With some toxins, death can occur in a week or a few days. Although a liver or kidney transplant may save some patients with complete organ failure, in many cases there are no organs available. Patients hospitalized and given aggressive support therapy almost immediately after ingestion of amanitin-containing mushrooms have a mortality rate of only 10%, whereas those admitted 60 or more hours after ingestion have a 50–90% mortality rate. In the United States alone each year, an average of seven people die from mushroom poisoning. Over 1,300 emergency room visits in the United States were attributed to poisonous mushroom ingestion in 2016, with about 9% of patients experiencing a serious adverse outcome.

Society and culture

Folk traditions
Many folk traditions concern the defining features of poisonous mushrooms.  However, there are no general identifiers for poisonous mushrooms, so such traditions are unreliable. Guidelines to identify particular mushrooms exist, and will serve only if one knows which mushrooms are toxic.

Examples of erroneous folklore "rules" include:
 "Poisonous mushrooms are brightly colored." – Indeed, fly agaric, usually bright-red to orange or yellow, is narcotic and hallucinogenic, although no human deaths have been reported. The deadly destroying angel, in contrast, is an unremarkable white.  The deadly Galerinas are brown. Some choice edible species (chanterelles, Amanita caesarea, Laetiporus sulphureus, etc.) are brightly colored, whereas most poisonous species are brown or white.
 "Insects/animals will avoid toxic mushrooms." – Fungi that are harmless to invertebrates can still be toxic to humans; the death cap, for instance, is often infested by insect larvae.
 "Poisonous mushrooms blacken silver." – None of the known mushroom toxins react with silver.
 "Poisonous mushrooms taste bad." – People who have eaten the deadly Amanitas and survived have reported that the mushrooms tasted quite good.
 "All mushrooms are safe if cooked/parboiled/dried/pickled/etc." – While it is true that some otherwise-inedible species can be rendered safe by special preparation, many toxic species cannot be made toxin-free. Many fungal toxins are not particularly sensitive to heat and so are not broken down during cooking; in particular, α-Amanitin, the poison produced by the death cap (Amanita phalloides) and others of the genus, is not denatured by heat.
 "Poisonous mushrooms will turn rice red when boiled." – A number of Laotian refugees were hospitalized after eating mushrooms (probably toxic Russula species) deemed safe by this folklore rule and this misconception cost at least one person her life.
 "Poisonous mushrooms have a pointed cap. Edible ones have a flat, rounded cap." – The shape of the mushroom cap does not correlate with presence or absence of mushroom toxins, so this is not a reliable method to distinguish between edible and poisonous species. Death cap, for instance, has a rounded cap when mature.
 "Boletes are, in general, safe to eat." – It is true that, unlike a number of Amanita species in particular, in most parts of the world, there are no known deadly varieties of the genus Boletus, which reduces the risks associated with misidentification. However, mushrooms like the Devil's bolete are poisonous both raw and cooked and can lead to strong gastrointestinal symptoms, and other species like the lurid bolete require thorough cooking to break down toxins. As with another mushroom genera, proper caution is, therefore, advised in determining the correct species.

Notable cases
 Siddhartha Gautama (known as The Buddha), by some accounts, may have died of mushroom poisoning around ~479 BCE, though this claim has not been universally accepted.
 Roman Emperor Claudius is said to have been murdered by being fed the death cap mushroom. However, this story first appeared some two centuries after the events, and it is even debatable whether Claudius was murdered at all. Pope Clement VII is also rumored to have been murdered this way. However, it is similarly debated whether he died from any kind of poisoning at all.
 Holy Roman Emperor Charles VI and Tsaritsa Natalia Naryshkina are believed to have died from eating the death cap mushroom.
 The composer Johann Schobert died in Paris, along with his wife, all but one of his children, maidservant, and four acquaintances after insisting that certain poisonous mushrooms they had gathered were edible, against the express warning of cooks at two separate restaurants he had taken the mushrooms to.
 The best-selling author Nicholas Evans (The Horse Whisperer) was poisoned (but survived) after eating Cortinarius rubellus.
 The parents of the physicist Daniel Gabriel Fahrenheit, who created the Fahrenheit temperature scale, died in Danzig on 14 August 1701 from accidentally eating poisonous mushrooms.

In fiction
  In the American Civil War drama The Beguiled, Clint Eastwood's character John McBurney, an injured Union soldier at a boarding school for girls, was poisoned by a jealous, vengeful headmistress and her young female students. The headmistress was played by Geraldine Page.
 In the Bollywood movie 7 Khoon Maaf, Modhusudhon Tarafdar (Naseeruddin Shah), a Bengali doctor who rescues Susanna from a suicide attempt and marries her, tries to poison Susanna with mushroom soup several years later for her inheritance.
 Linda Howard's action/romance novel Kiss Me While I Sleep has the anti-heroine use synthetic orellanine as a weapon.
 In Julius Streicher's Nazi propaganda children's book The Poisonous Mushroom, Jews are compared to deadly fungi.
 In The Story of Babar by Jean de Brunhoff, the King of the Elephants died from eating a poisonous mushroom.
 The 1993 Italian film Fiorile features a woman who takes revenge on her brother by feeding him poisonous mushrooms.
 In the 2006 Game Boy Advance video game title Mother 3 the main protagonists, Lucas and friends, ingest poisonous mushrooms and have a bad trip.
 In the 2017 film Phantom Thread, Alma fed poisonous mushrooms to the renowned fashion designer Reynolds Woodcock.
 The Super Mario series has a Poison Mushroom, a deadly variant of the Super Mushroom which kills the player or removes their powerup if they have one.

See also
 List of deadly fungi
 List of poisonous fungi

References

External links 

 Poisonous American Mushrooms – AmericanMushrooms.com
 Poisonous mushrooms: microscopic identification in cooked specimens from medical mycologist R.C. Summerbell
 Mushroom Poisoning Syndromes from the North American Mycological Association
 Mushroom Poisoning Case Registry (North America) from the North American Mycological Association
 American Association of Poison Control Centers Provides information on the toxicity of mushrooms in your area, symptoms and first aid.
 

 
Mycotoxins
Toxic effect of noxious substances eaten as food